Châtenay is a commune in the Ain department in eastern France.

Geography
The Veyle flows north through the middle of the commune and forms part of its northern border.

Population

See also
Communes of the Ain department
Dombes

References

External links

La Dombes and the city of Chatenay

Communes of Ain
Ain communes articles needing translation from French Wikipedia